Irina Olegovna Lachina (born August 29, 1972, in Beltsy, Moldova, USSR) is a Moldovan-Russian actress, the daughter of Svetlana Toma.

born August 29 1972, in Beltsy, Moldova.

Filmography

Films
 Flight Crew (2016) as passenger woman lawyer
 Legend № 17 (2012) as the spectator
 U Pana Boga w ogródku (2007) as Marusia
 A Hídember (2002) as Crescense
 Tayny dvortsovykh perevorotov (2001)
 U Pana Boga za piecem (1998) as Marusia
 Bluzhdayushchiye zvyozdy (1991) as Irina Toma

Television
Filipp's Bay (2006) as Veronika
 Okhota na geniya (2006) as Sheyla
 Dzisay (2005)
 Luchshiy gorod Zemli (2003) as herself
 Lyudi i teni. Film vtoroy: Opticheskiy obman (2002) as Natasha
 Hellfire (1996) as young Carlotta

External links 
 

1972 births
Living people
People from Bălți
Moldovan emigrants to Russia
Moldovan film actresses
Moldovan television actresses
Russian film actresses
Russian television actresses